John Joseph Hennessy (July 19, 1847 – July 13, 1920) was an Irish-born prelate of the Roman Catholic Church. He served as the first bishop of the new Diocese of Wichita in Kansas from 1888 until his death in 1920.

Biography

Early life 
John Hennessy was born near Cloyne, County Cork, to Michael and Ellen (née Cronin) Hennessy. In 1850 he and his parents came to the United States, where they settled at St. Louis, Missouri. He received his early education at the local cathedral school and the Christian Brothers College in Town and Country, Missouri, graduating there in 1862. He completed his theological studies at St. Francis Seminary in Milwaukee, Wisconsin, and his philosophical studies at St. Vincent College in Cape Girardeau.

Priesthood 
Hennessy was ordained to the priesthood by Bishop Joseph Machebeuf for the Archdiocese of St. Louis on November 28, 1869. At age 22, he was below the age requirement for ordination, but was granted a dispensation by Pope Pius IX.

Hennessy then served as pastor of a parish in Iron Mountain, Missouri, with his jurisdiction extending as far south as Arkansas. He erected churches in Missouri at Bismarck, Doniphan, Poplar Bluff, Gatewood, Graniteville, and Farmington. Hennessy established the Catholic Railroad Men's Benevolent Union in 1871, a convent for the Ursuline Sisters at Arcadia in 1877, and the first total abstinence society in southeast Missouri. 

In 1878, Hennessy was elected procurator and vice-president of the Catholic Protectory for Boys at Glencoe, Missouri. He became rector of St. John's Church at St. Louis in 1880. That same year, he became editor of the St. Louis Youths' Magazine and in 1882 secretary of the St. Louis Orphan Board. He also served as treasurer of the diocesan clergy fund and spiritual director of the St. Vincent de Paul Society.

Bishop of Wichita 
On February 11, 1888, Hennessy was appointed the first bishop of the newly erected Diocese of Wichita by Pope Leo XIII. He was technically the second Bishop of Wichita, as Rev. James O'Reilly was appointed the first bishop in 1887, but died before his episcopal consecration. Hennessy was consecrated on November 30, 1888, by Archbishop Peter Kenrick, with Archbishop John Hennessy and Bishop Louis Fink serving as co-consecrators. 

In 1890, Hennessy persuaded the Sisters of the Sorrowful Mother to come to the United States and take over management of St. Francis Hospital in Wichita.In 1898 he convened the first diocesan synod. He broke ground for the Cathedral of the Immaculate Conception in Wichita in April 1906 and laid the cornerstone the following October; it was later dedicated by Cardinal James Gibbons in September 1912. Between 1891 and 1898, he also served as apostolic administrator of the Diocese of Concordia in Kansas.

On July 13, 1920, Hennessy suffered a stroke and died in Wichita a few hours later. He was buried from the Cathedral which he erected.

References

External links
 

1847 births
1920 deaths
People from County Cork
Irish emigrants to the United States (before 1923)
St. Francis Seminary (Wisconsin) alumni
St. Vincent College (Missouri) alumni
American Roman Catholic clergy of Irish descent
Roman Catholic bishops of Wichita
19th-century Roman Catholic bishops in the United States
20th-century Roman Catholic bishops in the United States